Karl Bolivar Olafsen (22 June 1880 – 2 February 1927) was a Norwegian politician.

He was born in Tune to Bernhard Brynhildsen and Karoline Elisabeth Olavesdatter. He was elected representative to the Storting for the periods 1922–1924 and 1925–1927, for the Social Democratic Labour Party. He served as mayor of Sarpsborg from 1919.

References

1880 births
1927 deaths
People from Sarpsborg
Mayors of places in Østfold
Social Democratic Labour Party of Norway politicians
Members of the Storting